Nikola Mektić and Jürgen Melzer were the defending champions, but Mektić chose not to participate.

Jamie Murray and Neal Skupski won the title, defeating Melzer and Édouard Roger-Vasselin in the final via walkover.

Seeds

Draw

Draw

References

External Links
 Main Draw

Sofia Open
Sofia Open